Sphingobacteriia is a taxonomic class composed of a single order of environmental bacteria that are capable of producing sphingolipids. The earlier name Sphingibacteria was changed in 2011.

References

External links
Taxonomy at LPSN
NCBI
NamesForLife
UniProt

 
Bacteroidota
Bacteria classes